The Wesley Methodist Church, located on Haunz Lane in Oldham County near Anchorage, Kentucky, is a historic church which was listed on the National Register of Historic Places in 1987.

It was built in 1824 and, in its 1984 Kentucky historic resources site inventory, it was identified as the "only known unaltered early stone church" in Kentucky.

It was built by Silas Bobbitt, age 20, and Bruce Jean, age 18.

References

19th-century buildings and structures in Louisville, Kentucky
Methodist churches in Kentucky
Churches on the National Register of Historic Places in Kentucky
Federal architecture in Kentucky
Churches completed in 1824
19th-century Methodist church buildings in the United States
Churches in Oldham County, Kentucky
National Register of Historic Places in Oldham County, Kentucky
Stone churches in the United States